Mayurhand (also written as Majurhand) is a village and gram panchayat in the Mayurhand CD block in the Chatra subdivision of  the Chatra district in the Indian state of Jharkhand.

Geography

Location                             

Area overview
The map alongside shows that the forests (mark the light shading), covering around 60% of Chatra district, are evenly spread across the district. The map provides links to three CCL operational areas.

Note: The map alongside presents some of the notable locations in the district. All places marked in the map are linked in the larger full screen map.

Demographics
According to the 2011 Census of India, Majurhand (location code 349125) had a total population of 3,404, of which 1,702 (50%) were males and 1,702 (50%) were females. Population in the age range 0–6 years was 580. The total number of literate persons in Majurhand was 1,876 (66.43% of the population over 6 years).

Civic administration

CD block HQ
Headquarters of Mayurhand CD block is at Mayurhand village.

References

Villages in Chatra district